Franck Mérelle (born 25 May 1960) is a French former professional footballer who played as a goalkeeper.

External links
 Franck Mérelle profile at chamoisfc79.fr

1960 births
Living people
People from Meaux
Footballers from Seine-et-Marne
French footballers
Association football goalkeepers
FC Martigues players
Paris Saint-Germain F.C. players
AS Cannes players
AJ Auxerre players
Chamois Niortais F.C. players
Red Star F.C. players
Ligue 1 players
Ligue 2 players